César Nicolás Penson (23 January 1855 – 29 October 1901) was an author, poet, and lawyer from the Dominican Republic.

Biography 
The son of Juana Tejera and William Nicholas Penson (an Englishman), he attended an elementary school where he learned to read and write. Later, he attended the Colegio San Luis Gonzaga in his hometown, where he perfected his studies in languages, music and mathematics from an early age standing out in literature.

Works 
 Cosas añejas: Tradiciones y episodios de Santo Domingo. Santo Domingo, 1891. 
 Reseña histórico-crítica de la poesía en Santo Domingo. San Pedro de Macoris: Ouisqueya, 1892.

References 

1855 births
1901 deaths
Dominican Republic journalists
Male journalists
19th-century Dominican Republic lawyers
Philologists
19th-century Dominican Republic poets
Dominican Republic male poets
People from Santo Domingo
Dominican Republic people of English descent
White Dominicans
19th-century male writers